Eucotylidae is a family of trematodes belonging to the order Plagiorchiida.

Genera:
 Eucotyle Cohn, 1904
 Neoeucotyle Kanev, Radev & Fried, 2002
 Paratanaisia Teixeira de Freitas, 1959
 Tamerlania Skrjabin, 1924
 Tanaisia Skrjabin, 1924

References

Plagiorchiida